Aşağı Maralyan (also, Ashaga Maral’yan, Ashagy-Maral’yan, Maral’yan and Maral’yanskiy) is a village in the Jabrayil Rayon of Azerbaijan. It is currently uninhabited. In October 2022, it was occupied by the Azerbaijani Armed Forces.

References

External links

Populated places in Jabrayil District